Melitaea sindura is a butterfly of the family Nymphalidae. It is found in Kashmir, Chitral and Tibet.

Subspecies
Melitaea sindura sindura
Melitaea sindura honei Belter, 1942

References

Butterflies described in 1865
Melitaea
Butterflies of Asia
Taxa named by Frederic Moore